Roger Hicks (born Roger Glanville-Hicks) is an Australian rock musician active for a few years in the late 1960s.  Early in life, he also trained as a classical guitarist.  He is the nephew of Australian composer Peggy Glanville-Hicks.

He performed in the group Zoot from September 1968 to September 1969 and "The Brisbane Avengers" after that, and also composed and performed the acoustic guitar introduction to Russell Morris's hit song from 1969, "The Real Thing", which became the most recognisable "hook" to the song. Following this he also played and composed all the acoustic guitar parts in the coda to "The Real Thing" : "Part Three into Paper Walls" which ends with a reprise of the opening statement from "The Real Thing" heavily phased, thus tying together two songs which are in reality one song with a duration of 13:20 minutes.  "The Real Thing" reached no. 1 on hits charts across Australia, as well as in the United States' cities New York, Chicago and Houston.

He defected from Zoot in the fallout after the "Think Pink - Think Zoot" publicity campaign, which backfired in some ways, and moved for a time to the Brisbane Avengers.

Hicks now lives in southern France in a town called Nimes. He has long disappeared from the rock music scene and now spends his time busking and enjoying the simple life.

External links
 Zoot profile (archived version)

Australian rock guitarists
Living people
Australian classical guitarists
Australian male guitarists
Australian rock musicians
Lead guitarists
Musicians from Melbourne
Year of birth missing (living people)
Zoot (band) members